"Retko te viđam sa devojkama" ("I Rarely See You With Girls") is the second song which appeared on the first single by Serbian new wave band Idoli (the first being "Pomoć, pomoć").

History 
The band recorded two songs which would appear as the A-side of the single given as a present with the May release of the "Vidici" magazine.  The song did not actually appear as a B-side as both of the songs appeared on the A-side while the B-side contained Slobodan Škerović's narrative poem called "Poklon".

The song is widely regarded as the one of the first Yugoslavian, or more precisely, first Serbian song about homosexuality (first one was "Neki dječaci" from Prljavo kazalište in Zagreb, Croatia). The main focal point of the lyrics is a young man who is rarely seen amongst members of the opposite sex.

Track listing 
 Idoli - "Pomoć, pomoć"
 Idoli - "Retko te viđam sa devojkama"
 Slobodan Škerović - Poklon

Personnel 
 Vlada Divljan (guitar, vocals)
 Srđan Šaper (percussion, vocals)
 Nebojša Krstić (percussion)
 Zdenko Kolar (bass guitar)
 Boža Jovanović (drums)

Second version 

"Retko te viđam sa devojkama" was recorded once again in Zagreb with producer Goran Bregović and was released as a B-side of the Maljčiki single. This version of the song also appeared on the Svi marš na ples! compilation.

Track listing 
 "Maljčiki" (S. Šaper, V. Divljan)
 "Retko te viđam sa devojkama" (V. Divljan)

Personnel 
 Vlada Divljan (guitar, vocals)
 Srđan Šaper (percussion, vocals)
 Nebojša Krstić (percussion)
 Zdenko Kolar (bass guitar)
 Boža Jovanović (drums)

Cover versions 
 A Polish version of the song (entitled Rzadko Widuje Cie Z Dziewczętami) appeared on the Yugoton tribute album and was performed by Kasia Nosowska and Pawel Kukiz in 2001.
Serbian hard core/punk band Lude Krawe recorded a version of the song on their 2007 album Sve Tuđe.

External links 

 Pomoć, Pomoć / Poklon at Discogs
 Maljčiki / Retko Te Viđam Sa Devojkama at Discogs

1980 singles
Idoli songs
LGBT-related songs
Songs written by Vlada Divljan
1980 songs